Aranjman 2011 is Candan Erçetin's French–Turkish covers album released on 7 July 2011. Album contains arrangements covers, which are highly popular in Turkey during the 1960s-1970s.

Track listing 
 "Ali / Entarisi ala benziyor" (written by Darío Moreno & Jacques Plait, Turkish lyrics anonymous) – 4:26
 "L'aveugle / Memleketim" (written by Simon Saguy, Turkish lyrics by Fikret Şeneş, Yiddish lyrics anonymous) – 3:37
 "Volage Volage / Dünya Dönüyor" (written by Marc Aryan, Turkish lyrics by Fecri Ebcioğlu) – 4:03
 "Les Mouettes De Mikonos / Deniz ve Mehtap" (written by Andre Borly & Armand Canfora & Michel Jourdan, Turkish lyrics by Fecri Ebcioğlu) – 4:07
 "Tombe La Neige / Her Yerde Kar Var" (written by Salvatore, Turkish lyrics by Fecri Ebcioğlu) – 4:14
 "Que c'est Triste / Üç Kalp" (written by Patricia Carli, Turkish lyrics by Fecri Ebcioğlu) – 4:17
 "Sans Toi Je Suis Seul / Sessiz Gemi" (written by Franck Gérald & Patricia Carli, Turkish lyrics by Yahya Kemal Beyatlı) – 3:58
 "Tu Te Reconnaitras / Göreceksin Kendini" (written by Vline Buggy, Turkish lyrics by Nahman Varon) – 3:34
 "On S'embrasse Et On Oublie / Hoşgör Sen" (written by Enrico Macias & Yves Dessca, Turkish lyrics by Fikret Şeneş) – 3:20
 "Car Je Veux / Karlar Düşer" (written by Deboeck & Saintal & Salvatore, Turkish lyrics by Ali Selçuk Özgürdal) – 5:07
 "C'est Ecrit Dans Le Ciel / Bak Bir Varmış Bir Yokmuş" (written by André Tabet & Georges Tabet & Alec Alstone, Turkish lyrics by Fecri Ebcioğlu) – 3:16
 "Ce n'est Rien / Yalanmış" (written by Julien Clerc, Turkish lyrics by Reyman Eray) – 3:29
 "Pourquoi Parler D'amour / Selam Söyle" (written by Enrico Macias & Jean Claudric, Turkish lyrics by Ülkü Aker) – 4:00
 "İstanbul" (written by Kennedy Jimmy & Simon Nat) – 3:12

Sales

References 

Candan Erçetin albums
2011 albums
Covers albums